Rare Exports: A Christmas Tale is a 2010 Finnish fantasy action horror comedy film written and directed by Jalmari Helander about people living near Korvatunturi who discover the secret behind Santa Claus. The film is based on the 2003 short film Rare Exports Inc. and its 2005 sequel Rare Exports: The Official Safety Instructions by Jalmari Helander and Juuso Helander, both of which involve a company that traps wild Santa Clauses and trains and exports them to locations around the world.

Plot

An American and British research team from the firm Subzero are taking drill core samples on top of Korvatunturi (Ear Fell) in the Finnish region of Lapland. It is believed to be the home of Joulupukki, a figure in Finnish folklore that helped shape modern-day versions of Santa Claus. Team leader Riley realizes that the fell is an ancient burial mound built by the Sámi to conceal and imprison something. Two local boys, Juuso and Pietari, watch the team at work and eavesdrop on their discussions. They run to Juuso's nearby snowmobile quarreling about Santa Claus' existence as the team begins to excavate the fell using explosives. When they reach a glacier in the mountains, they find hundreds of reindeer carcasses.

Rauno heads to Korvatunturi to demand reparations from the Subzero company, whom he believes is responsible for the troubles over the reindeer. Instead, he finds a deep pit and no trace of the Subzero personnel. 

On the morning of Christmas Eve, the trap ensnares a naked old man. Pietari sneaks out of his father's house to a police truck and reaches the village, where Rauno hears that potato sacks, heaters, and a hair dryer have gone missing. Pietari learns that Juuso has also been missing, with a straw effigy found in his place.

Piiparinen, a colleague of Rauno, brings a sack containing the skinny old man and leaves his inactive body on a table in Rauno's reindeer slaughterhouse. While he, Rauno, and Aimo, another colleague, discuss their plans, Pietari finds that all his friends have gone missing. Piiparinen has his ear bitten off by the old man after he teases him with a piece of gingerbread. Pietari asks his father to spank him for his bad deeds, as he fears the children's bad deeds might have caused Santa to take them away. 

Rauno's group dresses the old man in Piiparinen's Santa costume and message the Americans that they "have found Santa Claus". They take the old man in a cage to an airbase, where they meet Riley, the only survivor of an attack that killed the other Subzero workers. Riley warns that the caged man is not Santa Claus but one of his elves, and that they must not behave rudely. When one of them swears, the other elves appear and destroy the electric lights, and kill Riley and his pilot. The men and Pietari run to Hangar 24, where they find a horned being in an enormous block of ice being melted by the missing heaters. Underneath the block of ice are several sacks containing the crying stolen children, including Juuso. 

Piiparinen comes out of the hangar and distracts the elves by throwing gingerbread at them to reach the helicopter. Rauno and Aimo make a net, which Pietari climbs on as it picks up the sacks of children to lure the elves to the reindeer pen. The other men place explosives all over Santa Claus' ice block and cut off his horns before fleeing the hangar in a truck. Pietari climbs down the net of children and an antenna to open the reindeer pen as the horde of elves runs toward him. Rauno and Aimo detonate the explosives, killing Santa Claus and causing the elves to stop at the reindeer pen before they can hurt Pietari. Afterwards, Rauno, now reconciled with Pietari, decides to start a new business with Subzero, in which the captured elves are trained to become mall Santas and exported to various locations worldwide.

Cast

Production
The film was produced by Cinet (Finland) in co-production with Pomor Film (Norway), Davaj Film (Sweden) and Love Streams Agnès B. Productions (France), with support from the Finnish Film Foundation, Norwegian Film Institute, FilmCamp and Filmpool Nord.

Development
In 2003, the Finnish commercials production company Woodpecker Film published the short movie Rare Exports Inc. online. (It is available on other YouTube channels as well.) Here, the film's writer and director Jalmari Helander established a band of three hunters (marker, sniper, and tracker) searching the wilderness of Lapland for the wild Santa Claus. After the positive reception from an online audience, Woodpecker Film produced and published the sequel short movie Rare Exports: The Official Safety Instructions in 2005, again with Helander as writer-director.

In 2007, Jalmari Helander introduced producer Petri Jokiranta to his idea of a feature-length Rare Exports film based on his short films that had already acquired a cult reputation on the Internet. Jokiranta's company, Cinet, picked up the rights and Helander started to develop the concept together with Jokiranta.

Release
In 2009, Rare Exports: A Christmas Tale was in production and in Christmas 2010 it was released simultaneously in Finland, Norway, Sweden, Germany, UK, US and Australia. The film was distributed in US by Oscilloscope Laboratories, an independent film distribution company.

Box office
Rare Exports: A Christmas Tale has grossed $4,015,133.

Home media
Rare Exports was released on DVD and Blu-ray Disc on 25 October 2011. The Blu-ray version includes the two original short films and a variety of featurettes, such as a "Making Of", a look at the concept art, explanation of the animatics and computer-generated imagery, the notoriously contemptible feature film Santa Claus Conquers the Martians, and other extras.

Critical reception
The site's critical consensus reads, "Rare Exports is an unexpectedly delightful crossbreed of deadpan comedy and Christmas horror." On Metacritic, which assigns a normalized rating to reviews, the film has a weighted average score of 71 out of 100, based on 18 critics, indicating "Generally favorable reviews".

Roger Ebert awarded the film three and a half out of four stars and called it "a rather brilliant lump of coal for your stocking" and considered it "an R-rated Santa Claus origin story crossed with The Thing." He continued, "Apart from the inescapable [fact] that the movie has Santa and reindeer in it, this is a superior horror film, a spot-on parody of movies about dead beings brought back to life. Oh, and all the reindeer are dead." Ebert concluded that "this is a fine film. An original, daring, carefully crafted film, that never for one instant winks at us that it's a parody. In its tone, acting, location work, music and inexorably mounting suspense, this is an exemplary horror film, apart from the detail that they're not usually subtitled A Christmas Tale and tell about terrifying wild Santas."

Novelist and critic Kim Newman gave the movie 4 out of 5 stars ("Excellent") and praised its "very black humour and a strange mix of revisionist mythology, gruesome horror and authentic Christmas spirit. It has a gritty, outdoorsy feel appropriate to an exploration of the brutal side of a harsh, all-male life in an extreme climate ... Helander also shows suspense chops in vintage John Carpenter mode – the scenes with the captured Santa, a grinning creature waiting for a chance to kill, are good, straight horror stuff, and there's an effective climactic siege of bearded monsters."

Michael Rechtshaffen of The Hollywood Reporter described the movie as "a fiendishly entertaining Christmas yarn rooted in Northern European legend and lore, complete with a not-so-jolly old St. Nick informed more by the Brothers Grimm than Norman Rockwell. While the richly atmospheric package has been wrapped with a healthy dose of wry satire, it's not of the mean-spirited Bad Santa variety. Helander, a successful commercial director in his native Helsinki, shrewdly blends just the right amounts of fairy tale wonder and action movie heroics into the oddball mix to highly satisfying effect." Jeannette Catsoulis of The New York Times called the movie "a thing of frigid beauty and twisted playfulness ... Kids will love the diminutive, motherless hero and a plot that's completely bonkers; adults will enjoy the exuberantly pagan images and deadpan humor." It was rated a New York Times Critics' Pick.
Sheri Linden of the Los Angeles Times praised the "twisted black humor in this frosty Finnish fantasy ... What unfolds is a dark comic thriller and action-hero send-up, a strange alloy of daredevil helicopter maneuvers and night of the living elves. Captured in atmospheric widescreen camerawork, the end-of-the-world frozen landscape (actually Norway) is spectacular and spooky."
Reviewer Annika Pham, writing for Cineuropa.org, described it as a "Tim Burton-esque version of Santa's story" and said, "The icy Lappish landscapes are beautifully captured by [director of photography] Mika Orasmaa and the feel of the large-scale adventure epic is wrapped up in sweeping musical orchestration. The scary elements (suggested more than shown) are sufficient to keep 13+ viewers on edge, but could have been further elaborated – along with the original concept – to make Rare Exports a timeless seasonal delight."

Collider.com's reviewer Dave Trumbore called the film "a darkly humored tale that fits perfectly in line with such anti-Christmas classics as Gremlins and The Nightmare Before Christmas" and wrote, "The contemporary Nordic setting that's so fitting for horror movies these days (Let the Right One In, Dead Snow) is a perfect backdrop for Rare Exports: A Christmas Tale, not only in mood but in mythology as well ... While Rare Exports: A Christmas Tale does not have the level of gore of Dead Snow or the emotional impact of Let the Right One In (although Pietari does earn his father's respect in the end), it's a uniquely entertaining tale that adds a bit of welcome darkness to the often saccharine times leading up to Christmas."

Awards
The film won numerous awards such as the Locarno International Film Festival's Variety Piazza Grande Award and Best Motion Picture, Best Cinematography, and Best Director – as well as a "Special Mention" for the Silver Méliès for Best European Motion Picture Award – at the 43rd Sitges Film Festival in 2010. In 2011, director Jalmari Helander and producer Petri Jokiranta received the Finnish Film State Award for their collaboration.

The film and crew earned further awards in 2011: nominated for Best Film for the Jussi Award, it won for Best Cinematography, Best Music, Best Sound Design, Best Editing, Best Art Direction, and Best Costume Design. The film won the Pegasus Audience Award at the Brussels International Fantastic Film Festival, and was nominated for the Academy of Science Fiction, Fantasy and Horror Films's Saturn Award in the category of Best International Film.

References

External links
 
 
 
 
 
 
 

2010 films
2010 horror films
2010 fantasy films
2010s Christmas horror films
2010 horror thriller films
Dark fantasy films
Finnish fantasy films
Finnish Christmas films
2010s Finnish-language films
2010s English-language films
English-language Finnish films
Films set in Finland
Santa Claus in film
Finnish horror thriller films
Films directed by Jalmari Helander
Icon Productions films
Scanbox Entertainment films
Features based on short films
2010 multilingual films
Finnish multilingual films